Keserű and  Keserü or Keșerü (Romanian spelling), English transliteration: Kesheru, are Hungarian-language surnames.  They may refer to:

Alajos Keserű, Hungarian water polo player 
Ferenc Keserű, Hungarian water polo player
Ferenc Keserű (cyclist), Hungarian cyclist
Etelka Keserű,  Hungarian economist and politician 

Ilona Keserü, Hungarian artist
Katalin Keserü, Hungarian artist and professor emeritus in arts

Claudiu Keșerü, Romanian footballer

Hungarian-language surnames